Adam Kwasnik (born 31 May 1983) is an Australian former professional association football player who played as a striker.

Club career
Kwasnik was part of the inaugural Central Coast Mariners squad in 2005–06, and was a substitute in the final that the Mariners lost 1–0. He was the leading Mariners goalscorer with seven goals in a disappointing campaign in 2006–07 for the Mariners. Kwasnik was scorer of the 200th goal in the A-League on 20 January 2006. Kwasnik started in the 2008 A-League Grand Final that the Mariners lost 1–0.

'Kwas', as he is known to teammates and fans alike, is second on the Mariners all-time leading goalscorers list with 35 goals from 136. He also had his own superstition of training with one sock around his ankle and the other pulled up to his knee.

Kwasnik made the move to Wellington Phoenix for the 2008–2009 season. After a disappointing season at the Phoenix, Kwasnik signed on 9 February 2009 with his former club Central Coast Mariners for the upcoming 2009 AFC Champions League and also for the 2009–10 A-League season.

Kwasnik was loaned out to Chinese Super League club and Mariners sister club Chengdu Blades during the 2010–11 off-season. He debuted in the season opener against Shandong Luneng and equalized to make it 3–3. The game would finish 3–3.

After injuries caused limited playing time in the Mariners' Championship winning season of 2012–13 and a new injury halted his 2013–14 season, Kwasnik announced his retirement. He is currently involved with youth clinics in the Central Coast area and still associated with the Mariners.

Honours

Club
Central Coast Mariners:
A-League Premiership: 2007–2008, 2011–2012
A-League Championship: 2012–13

Country
Australia
OFC U-20 Championship: 2002

References

External links
 Central Coast Mariners profile
 Oz Football profile

1983 births
Living people
Soccer players from Sydney
Australian people of Polish descent
Association football forwards
Australia youth international soccer players
Australia under-20 international soccer players
A-League Men players
National Soccer League (Australia) players
Blacktown City FC players
Central Coast Mariners FC players
Parramatta Power players
Northern Spirit FC players
Wellington Phoenix FC players
Chengdu Tiancheng F.C. players
Chinese Super League players
Expatriate footballers in China
Central Coast Mariners FC non-playing staff
Australian soccer players